Flogging Molly is an Irish-American seven-piece Celtic punk band formed in Los Angeles in 1995, led by Irish vocalist Dave King, formerly of the hard rock band Fastway and Katmandu. They are signed to their own record label, Borstal Beat Records.

History

Early years
Prior to forming Flogging Molly, Dublin-born Dave King was the lead singer for heavy metal band Fastway featuring guitarist "Fast" Eddie Clarke of Motörhead in the early to mid '80s. He later fronted a hard rock band called Katmandu (1991), featuring Mandy Meyer of Krokus on guitars. Afterwards, Dave King retained a record deal with Epic Records and began to work on a solo album, but began to reconsider his record deal when the label opposed his idea of bringing in traditional Irish instruments. King negotiated out of his record deal to go his own way musically soon after.

In 1993, King met guitarist Ted Hutt, bassist Jeff Peters, drummer Paul Crowder and violin player Bridget Regan and put together a rock band with a Celtic feel.  They began to play a mix of Irish traditional and rock.  Putting Dave's poetic lyrics to rocking melodies, they played at a Los Angeles pub called Molly Malone's weekly, building a small but loyal following. Together, they wrote songs such as "Black Friday Rule" and "Selfish Man", which was the beginning of Flogging Molly's sound. Ted and Jeff then left Flogging Molly because an earlier band of theirs, Reacharound, received a record deal.  Dave and Bridget began to find new members and the current band was formed.

They continued a routine of playing every Monday night at Molly Malone's. They put out a live album, Alive Behind the Green Door in 1997. In an interview with Kerrang! magazine, King stated that the band's name comes from the bar (Molly Malone's) that faithfully supported the band from the very beginning, "We used to play there every Monday night and we felt like we were flogging it to death, so we called the band Flogging Molly." They were signed onto SideOneDummy Records after a show when the record company's owners attended a concert and noted their intensity.

Career
Flogging Molly has released an independent (26f Records) live album titled Alive Behind the Green Door, as well as seven studio albums: Swagger, Drunken Lullabies, Within a Mile of Home, Float, Speed of Darkness, Life Is Good, and Anthem; and an acoustic/live DVD/cd combo Whiskey on a Sunday, which has gone platinum.  They have toured with the Warped Tour, Larry Kirwan's American Fléadh Festival and contributed to the Rock Against Bush project. They have sold in excess of a million and a half copies of recorded output as of December 6, 2006.

In March 2007, the band released an exclusive EP through iTunes entitled Complete Control Sessions. The EP includes two new tracks, as well as acoustic versions of previously released songs.  A year later Flogging Molly released Float, an album dubbed "one of the most important CDs of the year, if not the decade" by Alternative Press.  Flogging Molly also recognized the album as influential to their career as their first album recorded in Ireland (though mixed in California) by producer Ryan Hewitt.  Fans met the release with great anticipation and enthusiasm, landing it at No. 4 on the Billboard Top 200 Chart.  The album includes the band's first two chart singles, Requiem for a Dying Song (which hit No. 35 on the Billboard Modern Rock charts) and Float (which hit No. 40). Another accolade came to the band in June 2009 when their album "Drunken Lullabies" went gold.

Flogging Molly released a live DVD/CD set called Live at the Greek Theater in March 2010.  The 3-disc set (double CD + full-length DVD) captures Flogging Molly's performance at the Greek Theatre on September 12, 2009, and includes content spanning the band's entire catalog. The band appeared in the 2011 season premiere of Austin City Limits.

On March 10, 2016, the band released their first new material in five years, a single titled "The Hand of John L. Sullivan", honoring the Irish-American boxer of the same name. It is also the first studio recording with new drummer Mike Alonso. Life Is Good was released the following year and the band's follow-up to that was 2022's Anthem.

Salty Dog Cruises (2015–present) 
From March 13 to 16, 2015, Flogging Molly began hosting a yearly Caribbean cruise. The 2015 Salty Dog Cruise Cruise featured shows by the band and many others, over three days leaving from Miami to Nassau and Great Stirrup Cay on the Norwegian Sky. All bands performed two times on the stages throughout the ship or on the special stage set on Norwegian's private island of Great Stirrup Cay.

In 2016, from March 18 to 21, the second yearly cruise took the same itinerary on the same ship and hosted, among others, Rancid, Fishbone, Frank Turner, Street Dogs and The Tossers.

In 2017, the Enchantment of the Seas hosted the third annual cruise that left on March 10 to Coco Cay and Nassau, until coming back to Miami on March 13. The guests invited by the band were NOFX, DeVotchKa, Less Than Jake, The English Beat, The Skatalites, The Bouncing Souls, Dylan Walshe and many others.

On August 21, 2017, the band announced that the 2018 cruise will take place April 20–23, leaving from Miami, sailing to Key West and to Great Stirrup Cay. Originally, the cruise was supposed to take place on the Enchantment of the Seas as in 2017; however, the ship was changed and the Norwegian Sky has been announced. The line-up includes The Offspring, Buzzcocks, The Vandals, Lagwagon, and Mad Caddies, among others.

Musical style
Flogging Molly's music is influenced by various artists, such as The Dubliners, The Pogues, Horslips, Johnny Cash, The Clash. The album Within a Mile of Home is dedicated to the memories of Cash and The Clash frontman Joe Strummer.

Their music ranges from boisterous Celtic punk, like the pirate-themed "Salty Dog", "Cruel Mistress", and "Seven Deadly Sins" or the defiant "What's Left of the Flag", "Drunken Lullabies", and "Rebels of the Sacred Heart" to more somber songs like "Far Away Boys", "The Son Never Shines (On Closed Doors)", "Life in a Tenement Square" and "Float". Lyrics typically touch on subjects such as Ireland and its history, drinking, poverty, politics, love, and death and include several references to the Catholic Church. "What's Left of the Flag" and "The Likes of You Again" were written as tributes to Dave King's father, who died when King was a child.

Members

Current
 Dave King – lead vocals, acoustic guitar, bodhrán, banjo, spoons
 Bridget Regan – violin, tin whistle, backing and lead vocals
 Dennis Casey – guitar, vocals
 Matt Hensley – accordion, concertina
 Nathen Maxwell – bass guitar, vocals
 Spencer Swain – mandolin, banjo, guitar, vocals
 Mike Alonso – drums, percussion

Former 
 John Donovan – guitar
 Tobe McCallum – mandolin
 Ted Hutt – guitar
 Jeff Peters – bass
 Paul Crowder – drums
 Gary Sullivan – drums
 George Schwindt – drums
 Bob Schmidt – mandolin/banjo, bouzouki, guitar, vocals

Discography

Studio albums
 Swagger (2000)
 Drunken Lullabies (2002)
 Within a Mile of Home (2004)
 Float (2008)
 Speed of Darkness (2011)
 Life Is Good (2017)
 Anthem (2022)

References

External links

Interview with Dave King in the Irish Independent
Interview with Bob Schmidt in 2007
Burning Stars Interview with Flogging Molly – 2006
Flogging Molly Music Videos-Interviews-Live Performance at Roxwel

1997 establishments in California
Celtic punk groups
Irish-American culture
Musical groups established in 1997
Musical groups from Los Angeles
Musical groups from Dublin (city)
Punk rock groups from California
Rise Records artists
SideOneDummy Records artists